MV AMET Majesty (formerly Arberia, Wasa Queen, Orient Sun, Eurosun, Orient Express, Club Sea, Silja Star, Bore Star) was a car/passenger ferry operating in the Indian Ocean. She was registered with the Academy Of Maritime Education and Training, in Chennai, India as a training ship. The vessel was scrapped on 25 May 2013 at Alang.

References

External links
 Ship specs, history and photos

1975 ships